Games played (most often abbreviated as G or GP) is a statistic used in team sports to indicate the total number of games in which a player has participated (in any capacity); the statistic is generally applied irrespective of whatever portion of the game is contested. In baseball, the statistic applies also to players who, prior to a game, are included on a starting lineup card or are announced as ex ante substitutes, whether or not they play; however, in Major League Baseball, the application of this statistic does not extend to consecutive games played streaks. A starting pitcher, then, may be credited with a game played even if he is not credited with a game started or an inning pitched. The pitcher is the player who pitches the baseball from the pitcher's mound toward the catcher to begin each play, with the goal of retiring a batter, who attempts to either make contact with the pitched ball or draw a walk. The pitcher is often considered the most important player on the defensive side of the game, playing the most difficult and specialized position, and as such is regarded as being at the right end of the defensive spectrum. Pitchers play far less than players at other positions, generally appearing in only two or three games per week; only one pitcher in major league history has appeared in 100 games in a single season. There are many different types of pitchers, generally divided between starting pitchers and relief pitchers, which include the middle reliever, lefty specialist, setup man, and closer. In the scoring system used to record defensive plays, the pitcher is assigned the number 1.

The sharp rise in the importance of relief pitching after 1950, and increased specialization in later decades, has led to a great increase in the number of players with high totals in games as a pitcher. Through the 2022 season, the top 24 players in career games pitched were all relief pitchers whose careers began after 1950, only two of whom were active before 1968; the top three pitchers are all left-handed. Jesse Orosco is the all-time leader in career games played as a pitcher with 1,252. Only sixteen different players have pitched in over 1,000 games during their careers.

Key

List

Stats updated through the 2022 season

Other Hall of Famers

References

External links

Major League Baseball statistics
Games played as a pitcher